Heusler is a German surname. Notable people with the surname include:

 Andreas Heusler (1865–1940), Swiss medievalist
 Friedrich Heusler (1866–1947), German mining engineer and chemist
 Heusler compound

See also
 Heusler, Indiana

German-language surnames